Secheron Peak is a mountain in South West Tasmania.  It lies on the southeastern end of the Frankland Range near the impoundment Lake Pedder.  It is east of Frankland Peak and towers over Lake Surprise to the north.  Right Angle Peak lies one kilometre to the southwest.

See also

 Strathgordon, Tasmania
 South West Wilderness, Tasmania

References
 Maconochie 4223, Edition 1 2003, Tasmania 1:25000 Series, Tasmap

Mountains of Tasmania
South West Tasmania